Giovanni Passiglia (born 28 August 1981 in Castelvetrano) is an Italian footballer who plays as a midfielder.

Career
Passiglia started his career at Internazionale. In 2000, he joined Arezzo, along with Giuseppe Ticli, Nello Russo and Cristian Lizzori.

Except on loan to Serie B team Ancona in 2nd half of 2002–03 season, he was played in Serie C1 until followed Arezzo promoted to Serie B in summer 2004.

In summer 20065, he joined Pisa of Serie C1, and won promotion to Serie B again.

In January 2008, after lack of chance to play, he signed for league rival Vicenza.

In August 2009, he was loaned to Aurora Pro Patria 1919.

References

External links
gazzetta.it 

1981 births
Living people
People from Castelvetrano
Italian footballers
Inter Milan players
S.S. Arezzo players
A.C. Ancona players
Pisa S.C. players
L.R. Vicenza players
Association football midfielders
Footballers from Sicily
Sportspeople from the Province of Trapani